Methoxypiperamide (also known as MeOP and MEXP) is a psychoactive drug of the piperazine class that has been sold online as a designer drug. It is the 4-methoxy-α-keto analog of methylbenzylpiperazine.

Very little data exists about the pharmacology and toxicity of methoxypiperamide; however, the US state of Vermont classifies it as a hallucinogen.

Legal status 

Methoxypiperamide is a controlled substance in Vermont as of January 2016, and also in Hungary.

See also 
 Substituted piperazine
 Sunifiram

References

Designer drugs
Piperazines
Amides
Methoxy compounds